Jalan Lahat–Simpang Pulai, Federal Route 3150 (formerly Perak State Route A106), is an industrial federal road in Ipoh, Perak, Malaysia.

The Kilometre Zero is located at Simpang Pulai.

At most sections, the Federal Route 3150 was built under the JKR R5 road standard, with a speed limit of 90 km/h.

List of junctions

References

Malaysian Federal Roads